The House at 269 Green Street in Stoneham, Massachusetts is a well-preserved Greek Revival cottage with unusual layout.  Unlike most small Greek Revival houses, the roof slope faces front, and shelters a cutaway porch supported by square Tuscan columns.  Built c. 1810, it has typical Greek Revival features, including corner pilasters and an entry framed by sidelight windows.  Several houses of this type were built in Stoneham; this one is the best-preserved.

The house was listed on the National Register of Historic Places in 1984.

See also
National Register of Historic Places listings in Stoneham, Massachusetts
National Register of Historic Places listings in Middlesex County, Massachusetts

References

Houses on the National Register of Historic Places in Stoneham, Massachusetts
Houses completed in 1840
Houses in Stoneham, Massachusetts